Marc Dennis Anderson (born December 10, 1955) is an American born percussionist, composer, poet and Zen Buddhist priest. Best known for records and live performances with guitarist and composer Steve Tibbetts, he has recorded and performed with dozens of notable artists. His interests and studies in non-western instruments and musical traditions are a signature of his sound and technical style.

Early life and education
Anderson was born in Austin, Minnesota, the son of Truman Anderson and Mary Lou Regner. He is the oldest of 5 children. He attended Austin Central High School and holds a degree in Cultural Anthropology from the University of Minnesota.

Career
In 1977 Anderson met and began working with Steve Tibbetts who had just started working his second record. That record, titled YR, led to their first recording with the prestigious German record company ECM and legendary producer Manfred Eicher. In the fall of 1982 the two flew to Oslo, Norway and recorded Northern Song, the first of many recordings the pair would make over the next several decades. 
Through the 1980s and 1990s Anderson became a stalwart in the Twin Cities music community as a sideman and bandleader performing and recording in a wide range of musical and artistic environments including; free improvisation, traditional Irish, Ghanaian, Finnish and Americana folk music, experimental, avant-garde, jazz and pop. He also produced a number of records including two recordings as leader and composer: Time Fish and Ruby. He has toured extensively in the US, Europe and Asia. He was the founder of two Twin Cities musical groups: Eight head and Speaking In Tongues. His most recent musical project in called Music and Words.
In the early 1980s he met Sowah Mensah, a musician and teacher from Ghana, launching a friendship and new musical direction. Anderson went on to study Ghanaian music with Mensah and with teachers in Ghana for many years. He has also studied Haitian ritual drumming with John Amira in New York, spent time with the great frame drum master Glen Velez, took study abroad trips to China and Brazil and spent several years studying tabla with Marcus Wise and djembe drumming with Foday Bangoura in the Twin Cities.

Zen
Anderson began doing transcendental meditation in 1983. He was ordained in 2007 by Togen Robin Moss. Anderson runs a community based project called The Urban Monk Project – facilitating meditation sessions, retreats and developmental training programs.

Partial discography

As leader/composer/producer
Time Fish - 1993
Ruby -2002
Festival Africa - 2001
World Music - 2002

With Steve Tibbetts
Yr – 1980
Northern Song – 1981
Safe Journey – 1984
Exploded View - 1986
Big Map Idea – 1988
The Fall Of Us All – 1994
Cho  (with Choying Drolma) – 1997
A (with Knute Hamre) - 1998
A Man About A Horse – 2002
Selwa (with Choying Drolma) – 2004
Natural Causes – 2010
Life Of - 2018

As a sideman with

David Sylvian and Robert Fripp
The First Day -1993

Peter Ostroushko
Heart of the Heartland – 1995
Pilgrims On The Heart Road - 1997
Coming Down From Red Lodge – 2003
Sacred Heart - 2000
Minnesota A History Of The Land – 2005
Heartland Holiday - 2005
Postcards - 2006

Greg Brown
One More Goodnight Kiss – 1988

Peter Mayer
Million Year Mind (artist and producer) - 1999
Bountiful (artist and producer) – 2000
Elements (artist and producer) -2001
Earth Town Square (artist and producer) -2003
Midwinter – 2005
Novelties - 2007

Claudia Schmidt
It Looks Fine From here – 1994

Ruth Mackenzie
Kalevala: Dream Of The Salmon Maiden - 1998

References

1955 births
Living people
American male poets
Zen Buddhist priests
People from Austin, Minnesota
University of Minnesota College of Liberal Arts alumni
American percussionists
American composers